Carlos Manuel Rivera (born January 1, 1978) is an American professional boxer of Puerto Rican descent, who fights in the Featherweight division. His nickname is El Rayo.

Pro career
On May 8, 2009 Rivera beat the veteran Alex Baba at the A La Carte Event Pavilion in Tampa, Florida.

In August 2009, Carlos lost to an undefeated Mikey Garcia, the bout was televised on TV Azteca.

References

External links

American people of Puerto Rican descent
Featherweight boxers
1978 births
Living people
Puerto Rican male boxers
Place of birth missing (living people)
American male boxers